Phosphomonoesterase may refer to:
 Phosphoric monoester hydrolases, an enzyme
 Acid phosphatase, an enzyme